The 1935 Paris–Nice was the third edition of the Paris–Nice cycle race and was held from 26 March to 31 March 1935. The race started in Paris and finished in Nice. The race was won by René Vietto.

General classification

References

1935
1935 in road cycling
1935 in French sport
March 1935 sports events